Tanaproget (INN; developmental code names NSP-989, WAY-166989) is an investigational nonsteroidal progestin. It is a high affinity, high efficacy, and very selective agonist of the progesterone receptor (PR). Due to its much more selective binding profile relative to most conventional, steroidal progestins, tanaproget may prove to produce fewer side effects in comparison. As of December 2010, it is in phase II clinical trials in the process of being developed for clinical use as a contraceptive by Ligand Pharmaceuticals.

An analog of tanaproget, 4-fluoropropyltanaproget (18F), has been developed as a radiotracer for imaging of the PR in positron emission tomography.

See also
 Finerenone
 Mapracorat
 Prinaberel

References

Progestogens
Nitriles
Pyrroles
Thiocarbamates